Tchintabaraden is a department of the Tahoua Region in Niger. Its capital lies at the city of Tchintabaraden. As of 2011, the department had a total population of 124,337 people.

References

Departments of Niger
Tahoua Region